Egi Melgiansyah (born 4 September 1990) is an Indonesian professional footballer who plays as a midfielder for Liga 2 club Perserang Serang.

Club career 
On December 6, 2014, he signed with Pusamania Borneo.

International goals

U–19

U–23

Honours

Club
Arema Cronus
 Menpora Cup: 2013

Persita Tangerang
 Liga 2 runner-up: 2019

International
Indonesia U-23
 Southeast Asian Games  Silver medal: 2011, 2013

References

External links 
 
 Egi Melgiansyah at Liga Indonesia

Indonesian footballers
Living people
1990 births
People from Bogor
Sportspeople from West Java
Pelita Jaya FC players
Liga 1 (Indonesia) players
Arema F.C. players
Borneo F.C. players
Perserang Serang players
Persija Jakarta players
Persita Tangerang players
Liga 2 (Indonesia) players
Indonesia youth international footballers
Association football midfielders
Southeast Asian Games silver medalists for Indonesia
Southeast Asian Games medalists in football
Competitors at the 2011 Southeast Asian Games